The Federal College of Education, Kontagora is a federal government higher education institution located in Kontagora, Niger State, Nigeria. It is affiliated to Ahmadu Bello University for its degree programmes. The current Provost is Faruk Rashid Haruna.

History 
The Federal College of Education, Kontagora was established in 1978.

Courses 
The institution offers the following courses;

 Christian Religious Studies
 English Language Education
 Integrated Science Education
 Chemistry Education
 French
 Igbo
 Arabic
 Hausa
 Computer Education
 Mathematics Education
 Agricultural Science
 Business Education
 Home Economics
 Islamic Studies
 Biology
 Physical and Health Education
 Primary Education Studies
 Political Science
 Social Studies
 Fine and Applied Arts

Affiliation 
The institution is affiliated with the Ahmadu Bello University to offer programmes leading to Bachelor of Education, (B.Ed.) in;

 Education And Agricultural Science
 Education And English Language
 Education And Mathematics
 Home Economics And Education
 Business Education
 Education And Biology
 Education And Chemistry
 Education & Islamic Studies
 Education And Social Studies
 Education & Arabic
 Physical And Health Education
 Education And Hausa
 Education & Christian Religious Studies
 Education & Physics
 Education And Integrated Science

References

Federal colleges of education in Nigeria
1978 establishments in Nigeria
Educational institutions established in 1978
Education in Niger State